Astro Boy is a 2009 computer-animated superhero film loosely based on the manga series of the same name by the Japanese writer and illustrator Osamu Tezuka. Produced by the Hong Kong-based company Imagi Animation Studios, it was directed by David Bowers, who co-wrote the screenplay with Timothy Hyde Harris. The film stars Freddie Highmore, Kristen Bell, Nathan Lane, Eugene Levy, Matt Lucas, Bill Nighy, Samuel L. Jackson, Donald Sutherland, Charlize Theron, and Nicolas Cage. In the film, Dr. Tenma (Cage) creates Astro (Highmore), a teenage robot implanted with Toby's memories after the death of Tenma's son. The pair face Stone (Sutherland), the president of Metro City who is running for re-election, for their betrayal.

The film was first released in Hong Kong on October 8, 2009, and in the United States on October 23, 2009. It received generally mixed reviews from film critics and was a financial failure, earning  worldwide against its  budget. As a result of the film's poor performance, Imagi  was shut down on February 5, 2010, and Astro Boy became the final film produced by the studio.

Plot

In the 22nd century, Toby Tenma is a teenager who lives in the futuristic city-state of Metro City, which floats above the polluted surface on Earth. His father, Dr. Tenma, works at the Ministry of Science, alongside Dr. Elefun. They create the Peacekeeper, an advanced defensive robot fueled by using two powerful energy spheres with opposing properties, respectively in colors blue and red from a star fragment discovered by Dr. Elefun. The two scientists brief the President of Metro City, Stone, who is running for re-election. Against the scientists' warnings, Stone loads the negative red core and Peacekeeper becomes hostile immediately. Toby is accidentally killed by the Peacekeeper, as it attempts to violently leave the research facility before Dr. Elefun disables it.

A distraught-driven Tenma revives Toby as a robot programmed with all his memories, but also makes his body with built-in defenses to protect him. Powered by the positive blue core, the robot activates and believes himself to be Toby. Though the robot has Toby's original brain and a similar personality, Tenma realizes Toby could never be truly revived. Toby discovers his new robot capabilities including the ability to understand non-talking robots and rocket-powered flight. Stone has his forces pursue Toby, but the chase leads to him falling off the city's edge when Stone's flagship blasts him with missiles. Meanwhile, Tenma escapes arrest by agreeing to disable Toby and give up the blue core.

Toby awakens in an enormous junkyard, created from the redundant robots of Metro City it dumped there. He meets a group of orphaned children, Zane, Sludge, Widget, and Cora, accompanied by a dog-like robot named Trashcan. Toby also meets the members of the Robot Revolutionary Front (RRF), Sparx, Robotsky, and Mike the Fridge, who plan to free robots from mankind's control, but are very inept and bound by the Laws of Robotics. While attempting to recruit him for their cause, they rename Toby "Astro". Hamegg, the former head of the Ministry of Science and caretaker of the orphans, takes Astro in. The next day, Astro comes across an old, offline construction robot named Zog, whom he reactivates through sharing some of the Blue Core's energy. Hamegg scans Astro, discovering he is actually a robot, and paralyzes Astro with his electrical-blaster to use him in the fighting ring.

Astro reluctantly defeats Hamegg's fighters until Zog gets deployed. Astro and Zog refuse to fight and Hamegg attempts to disable both of them, but Zog, who predates the Laws of Robotics, nearly kills Hamegg until Astro saves him, shocking the crowd. Moments later, Stone's forces arrive to take Astro back to Metro City, and he willingly surrenders himself. Astro reunites with Tenma and Elefun and allows them to disable him. Realizing that he loves Astro as much as Toby, Tenma reactivates and frees Astro. Outraged, Stone powers up the Peacekeeper, who absorbs him and many other objects to a gargantuan size, prompting Astro to battle the rampaging bot. Metro City's power station gets destroyed during the fight, causing the city to fall, and Astro uses his superhuman strength to help it land safely.

The Peacekeeper tries absorbing Astro to get his Blue Core using the Red Core, but are separated due to the core's repulsive reactions. Dr. Tenma tells Astro the cores will violently destroy each other on contact. The Peacekeeper captures Astro's friends from the junkyard, and he flies into the Peacekeeper's core, sacrificing himself to destroy it. Stone survives and was arrested. As Elefun and the children find Astro disabled, Zog revives him   
with a surge of blue core energy. When a monstrous cycloptic extraterrestrial attacks the city, Astro leaps into action and punches it.

Cast

 Freddie Highmore as Toby Tenma/Astro Boy, Astro is a robot of Toby, Dr. Tenma's teenager son.
 Nicolas Cage as Dr. Tenma, Toby's father, Astro's creator, and the head of the Ministry of Science of Metro City.
 Kristen Bell as Cora, a teenager girl who lives on the Earth's surface and befriends Astro.
 Samuel L. Jackson as Zog, a 100-year-old construction robot brought back to life by Astro Boy's blue-core energy.
 Matt Lucas as Sparx, the leader of the Robot Revolutionary Front.
 Eugene Levy as Orrin, Tenma's cowardly robot household servant.
 Bill Nighy as Dr. Elefun, Dr. Tenma's best friend & associate; and as Robotsky, the muscle of the Robot Revolutionary Front.
 Donald Sutherland as President Stone, a ruthless, rogue, and ambitious President of Metro City who is running for re-election.
 Nathan Lane as Hamegg, a surface-dweller who repairs machines and then uses them in his fighting tournament.
 Charlize Theron as the "Our Friends" narrator, the voice used for an educational video seen at the film's beginning.
 David Bowers as Mike the Fridge, a talking refrigerator and third member of the Robot Revolutionary Front.
 Moisés Arias as Zane, a surface-dwelling child.
 Alan Tudyk as Mr. Squeegee, a cleaning robot that Astro encounters.
 David Alan Grier as Mr. Squirt, a cleaning robot that Astro encounters.
 Madeline Carroll as Widget, Sludge's twin.
 Sterling Beaumon as Sludge, Widget's twin.
 Dee Bradley Baker as Trashcan, a dog-like robot that eats the rubbish.
 Elle Fanning as Grace, a girl from Hamegg's house who kicks President Stone's leg.
 Ryan Stiles as Mr. Mustachio, Toby's teacher.
 Newell Alexander as General Heckler, President Stone's second in-command.
 Victor Bonavida as Sam, a teenage boy from Hamegg's house.
 Tony Matthews as Cora's dad.
 Bob Logan as Stinger One, President Stone's former pilot soldier who leads a group of aircraft with suction tubes and was dispatched to arrest Astro.
 Ryan Ochoa as Rick, another teenage boy from Hamegg's house.

Production

Development
In 1997, Sony Pictures Entertainment purchased the film rights to Astro Boy from Tezuka Productions, intending to produce a live-action feature film. Todd Alcott was set to write the screenplay, but the film halted in 2000 when Steven Spielberg began A.I. (2001), another film with a robot boy who replaces a dead child. In December 2001, Sony hired Eric Leighton to direct an all-CGI film, with Angry Films and Jim Henson Productions producing it for a 2004 release. A screenplay draft was written, but the film did not go into production, and Leighton left in early 2003 to pursue other film projects. In June 2004, animator and Dexter's Laboratory creator Genndy Tartakovsky was hired to direct a live-action/animatronics/CGI feature film. After writing the script, the film didn't go into the production, and Tartakovsky left next year to direct 3-D-animated feature films at a new studio, Orphanage Animation Studios. Few months later it was revealed, that he was set to direct The Dark Crystal (1982) sequel, The Power of the Dark Crystal, another co-production with Jim Henson Productions. In September 2006, it was announced that Hong Kong-based animation firm Imagi Animation Studios would produce a CGI animated Astro Boy film, with Colin Brady directing it. A year later, the studio made a three-picture distribution deal with Warner Bros. and The Weinstein Company, which also included TMNT (2007) and Gatchaman. In 2008, Summit Entertainment took over the film's distribution rights. The same year, Brady was replaced with David Bowers, who previously directed Flushed Away (2006), the last project under the relationship between DreamWorks Animation, the creators of the Shrek and Madagascar franchises and Aardman, the creators of the Wallace & Gromit franchise and Chicken Run.

Design

Like Imagi did with TMNT in 2007, the film was CGI animated on Maya and rendered on Pixar's RenderMan at Imagi's Los Angeles facility and its main studio in Hong Kong. Some changes to Astro's design had to be made in order to appeal to a western audience and making the leap to CGI. The more challenging was his kawaii portrayal, part of which were his large eyes and curly eyelashes, features that the filmmakers thought made him too feminine. Imagi had several discussions on how round and curvy Astro's body proportions should be and in the end they were made slimmer.
The by-product of these changes was Astro's Caucasian look. In early development Astro's design was young, resembling his iconic design of a 9-year-old boy. The design team changed that and made him look like a 13-year-old to appeal to a larger audience. They also gave him a white shirt, and a blue jacket since they thought it would be strange to have a normal boy running around without one. They also replaced his heart-shaped energy core with a glowing blue one.

Music
The score to Astro Boy was composed by John Ottman, who recorded his score with a 95-piece orchestra and choir at Abbey Road Studios. A soundtrack album was released on October 20, 2009, by Varèse Sarabande Records.
Songs in Astro Boy not composed by John Ottman are as follows: 
Breezy Day, composed by Roger-Roger.
Alright, written by Daniel Goffey, Gaz Coombes, and Michael Quinn and performed by Supergrass.
Marching Down the Field, composed by Harry Edwards.

Release

Marketing
Summit Entertainment partnered with McDonald's to produce marketing tie-ins for Astro Boy. Beginning in May 2009 and continuing through September 2009, IDW Publishing published a "prequel" and comic book adaptation of the film as both mini-series and in graphic novel format to coincide with the North American release of the film in October 2009. A model of a motionless Astro Boy waiting to be powered up was set up at Peak Tower, Hong Kong, outside Madame Tussauds Hong Kong in September 2009. A panel of the film was held at the San Diego Comic-Con on July 23, 2009.

Home media
Astro Boy was released on DVD and Blu-ray in the United States on March 16, 2010, by Summit Entertainment. Both releases include two new CGI animated sequences, a featurette with the voice cast, three other featurettes about drawing Astro Boy, making an CGI animated movie and getting the Astro Boy look, and an image gallery.

In Japan, a limited edition Astro Boy premium box set was released on April 2, 2010. It featured the same content from the American release with the exception of it spanning two DVD discs (one containing the film, the other containing special features with two that are exclusive to Japan) and has both English and Japanese dub (along with English and Japanese subtitles.) The box set also comes with a DVD (containing a single story on Astro's first flight and an image gallery), Dr. Tenma's Project Notes (featuring 80 pages of CGI models, character art and set designs from the film), a Micro SD (featuring the motion manga Atomu Tanjo (Birth of Astro Boy) originally written by Osamu Tezuka), a postcard of 1980 Astro Boy flying, a small bookmark (a reel from the film inside a plastic cover), and Astro's blueprints from the film.

Reception

Box office
The film was a flop in Japan, appearing at the bottom of the opening week's Top 10 rankings and earning only $328,457. Conversely, the film was very successful in China, breaking a box-office record for a CGI animated film. This follows the same pattern as Dragonball Evolution (2009) and Speed Racer (2008), other American-produced films based on Japanese sources that were not big hits in the land of their origin but were very successful in China. The film also was a box office bomb in the U.S., opening at No. 6, grossing $6.7 million, losing out to the similarly retro Where the Wild Things Are (2009). It remained in the Top 10 for three weeks. When it closed in January 2010, it had a total gross of $20 million. Due to these factors, the film would only produce a worldwide gross of $44.6 million against a $65 million budget.

Critical response
The website's critical consensus reads, "While it isn't terribly original, and it seems to have a political agenda that may rankle some viewers, Astro Boy boasts enough visual thrills to please its target demographic." On Metacritic, the film has a weighted average score of 53 out of 100 based on 22 critics, indicating "mixed or average reviews".

Owen Gleiberman of Entertainment Weekly gave the film a B and wrote that it had a "little too much lost-boys-and-girls mopiness", but "Astro Boy is a marvelously designed piece of cartoon kinetics..." Glenn Whipp of the Los Angeles Times gave the mixed review claiming "The kids won't get it but will enjoy the big, climactic robot rumpuses, which owe a heavy debt to Brad Bird's The Iron Giant (1999)". Manohla Dargis of The New York Times gave it a mixed review, criticizing the film's confused tonal mixture of darkness and "commercially motivated" optimism. Conversely, Roger Ebert gave the film three out of four stars, stating that "The movie contains less of its interesting story and more action and battle scenes than I would have preferred. [...] Still, Astro Boy is better than most of its recent competitors, such as Monsters vs. Aliens and Kung Fu Panda.'"

Accolades
At the 37th Annie Awards, Astro Boy received nominations for Outstanding Achievement for Storyboarding in a Feature Production (Sharon Bridgeman) and Outstanding Achievement for Writing in a Feature Production (Harris and Bowers). Linda Lamontagne was nominated for Outstanding Achievement in Casting – Animation Feature at the 2010 Artios Awards.

Video game

A video game based on the film was released on October 20, 2009, by D3 Publisher to coincide with the film's theatrical release. The Wii, PlayStation 2 and PSP versions were developed by High Voltage Software, and the Nintendo DS version by Art Co., Ltd.

References

External links

Official website (archived)

2009 films
2009 computer-animated films
2000s American animated films
2000s animated superhero films
2000s science fiction comedy films
2009 comedy films
American children's animated comic science fiction films
American children's animated superhero films
American computer-animated films
American robot films
Android (robot) films
Animated films about robots
Animated films based on animated series
Animated films based on manga
Anime-influenced Western animation
Astro Boy
Chinese animated science fiction films
D-Box motion-enhanced films
Films set in the 22nd century
Films based on works by Osamu Tezuka
Films directed by David Bowers
Films scored by John Ottman
Films set in the 2100s
Animated films set in the future
Hong Kong animated films
Hong Kong superhero films
Lionsgate animated films
Summit Entertainment animated films
Summit Entertainment films
Films about father–son relationships
2000s English-language films
2000s Hong Kong films
Films about orphans